U.S. Highway 85 or US 85 is a route in the system of United States Numbered Highways maintained by the Texas Department of Transportation (TxDOT). The Texas portion of US 85 is located entirely within El Paso County beginning at the U.S.-Mexico border between the city of El Paso and Ciudad Juárez, Chihuahua. The approximately  route briefly overlays  US 62 in downtown El Paso, then traverses north along the city's west side before merging with the combined route of Interstate 10 and  US 180. The route then follows I-10 and US 180 through the towns of Vinton and Anthony before crossing the New Mexico state line into the town of Anthony, New Mexico, in Doña Ana County.

US 85 was extended south into Texas in 1946. Prior to the completion of I-10 in El Paso, US 85 followed the former route of  US 80 which is now  SH 20.

Route description
US 85 begins at the Mexico–United States border between El Paso and Ciudad Juárez at the Paso del Norte International Bridge for northbound traffic and the Good Neighbor International Bridge for southbound traffic. The international bridges overpass without directly intersecting  Loop 375. The highway follows S. El Paso St. northbound and S. Stanton St. southbound to Paisano Dr.. The route is concurrent with US 62 from the border to Paisano Dr. where US 85 turns west while US 62 turns east. One block west of S. El Paso St., US 85 intersects S. Santa Fe St. which connects to Loop 375. The route follows Paisano Drive closely following the Rio Grande and the tracks of the Union Pacific Railroad and the BNSF Railway west of I-10, the campus of the University of Texas at El Paso, and the former Asarco smelter site.  From there, the route continued on Paisano Drive until merging with the combined route of I-10 and US 180: however, in June 2016, due to construction of what will become the Border West Expressway, the route of US 85 was detoured onto  SH 20 and local streets.  After rejoining I-10 and US 180, US 85 remains concurrent with them for the remainder of its length in Texas in greater El Paso's west side and upper valley regions.

US 85 intersects SH 20 at Mesa St. At Artcraft Rd., the route intersects  SH 178 which, together with New Mexico State Road 136, connects the route to the Santa Teresa, New Mexico, international port of entry. The route then intersects Loop 375 connecting the highway to the town of Canutillo and El Paso's northeast side where Fort Bliss is located. The highway then leaves El Paso and intersects  Spur 37 in Vinton just west of Westway. In Anthony, the route intersects  FM 1905 before crossing the state line into New Mexico.

History
US 85 was one of the original U.S. Numbered Highways established by the American Association of State Highway Officials. The first AASHO route log, published in 1927, did not place US 85 in Texas but instead as terminating in Las Cruces, New Mexico. AASHO extended the route south to El Paso in 1946.

The original alignment of US 85 in Texas was entirely concurrent with the former route of US 80 beginning at Texas Ave. and following Mesa St. and then Doniphan Dr. to the New Mexico state line along the current SH 20. US 85 was relocated to its current alignment in 1974, partially following the former routing of U.S. Route 80 (Alt.) after the completion of I-10 in El Paso. The current local TxDOT map shows US 85 terminating on Paisano Dr. at US 62 at S. El Paso St. with no concurrent along US 62 to the border. However, the present route log of the American Association of State Highway and Transportation Officials, as AASHO is now known, shows US 85 joining US 62 to the border.

Major intersections

See also

References

External links

85-0
 Texas
Transportation in El Paso County, Texas